Chrysorabdia bivitta is a moth of the subfamily Arctiinae first described by Francis Walker in 1856. It is found in the north-western Himalayas and the Indian states of Sikkim and Assam.

References

Lithosiini